Austrochaperina brevipes is a species of frog in the family Microhylidae. It is endemic to Papua New Guinea and known only from two localities, Mount Victoria and Myola Guest House in the Owen Stanley Range. Common name Victoria land frog has been suggested for it.

Description
Austrochaperina brevipes is a stocky, relatively broad-headed frog. The dorsum is reddish brown, brown, or yellowish brown. There is a yellow vertebral line.

This species probably breeds through direct development. A male was found attending 14 eggs, whereas a female of  contained ten eggs.

Habitat and conservation
The species' natural habitat is montane rainforest where they live in leaf litter and beneath logs. The threats to this poorly known species are unknown; this frog has not been seen since 1987.

References

brevipes
Amphibians of Papua New Guinea
Endemic fauna of Papua New Guinea
Taxonomy articles created by Polbot
Amphibians described in 1897